Snehashish Dutta is an Indian footballer who plays as a midfielder for Mohun Bagan in the I-League.

Career

Prayag United
Dutta spent one season at Prayag United S.C. where his biggest achievement was scoring in the Federation Cup against East Bengal. He then made his I-League debut against East Bengal on 29 October 2011.

Mohun Bagan
On 14 May 2012 it was announced that Dutta had signed for I-League team Mohun Bagan for the 2012–13 season.

Bhawanipore F.C.
In 2013, he joined Bhawanipore F.C. and played in 2013–14 Indian Federation Cup and 2014 I-League 2nd Division.

Career statistics

Club
Statistics accurate as of 18 May 2012

References

Indian footballers

Living people
Footballers from West Bengal
I-League players
United SC players
Association football midfielders
Year of birth missing (living people)
Aryan FC players